Dr. Yogesh Praveen (28 October 1938 – 12 April 2021) was an Indian author and expert on the history and culture of Avadh, specifically Lucknow. He had a Masters in Hindi and Sanskrit in addition to a doctorate in Literature from Meerut University.

He was the recipient of India's highly prestigious award Padma Shri 2020 for his work in the field of literature and education.

Books 
Dastane Avadh
Tajdare Avadh
Bahare Avadh
Gulistane Avadh
Doobta Avadh
Dastane Luknow
Aapka Lucknow
Lucknow monuments
Bire Basuri 
peele gulaab
Sanamkhana
sumanhaar
mayur pankh
Apraajita
laxmanpur ki aatmkatha
kanchanmrig
Indradhanush
shabnam
ankvilaas
Lucknow Sadiyo Ka Safer

Other works 
Apart from books he also published poetry. He had received a National Award for his book 'Lucknow Nama'. He had received several other awards, including the U.P. Ratna Award (2000), the National Teachers Award (1999), the Yash Bharti Award (2006), and the U.P. Sangeet Natak Academy Award (1998). He also wrote lyrics for the film Junoon; he was also known as encyclopedia of Lucknow. Besides being the lyricist in the movie Junoon, his co-operation was taken in both films by the name of Umraao Jaan in (1982) and (2007).

References

2021 deaths
1938 births
20th-century Indian historians
Historians of India
Chaudhary Charan Singh University alumni
20th-century Indian poets
Recipients of the Padma Shri in literature & education